P. Shwetha (born in Chennai, India) is an actress. She debuted in the critically acclaimed film Malli (1998), directed by Santosh Sivan, playing the young girl Malli, on an adventure to find a blue wishing stone to help cure her best friend's ailments. She won the National Film Award for Best Child Artist in 1999 for her performance in the film. She went on to win another National Film Award for Best Child Artist in 2002 for her role in the film Kutty. She most recently starred in the Santosh Sivan film Navarasa.

She did her college in Anna University, Chennai.

Filmography

References

External links 

Living people
Indian film actresses
Indian child actresses
Actresses in Tamil cinema
Child actresses in Tamil cinema
Best Child Artist National Film Award winners
Year of birth missing (living people)